Buin Rural LLG is a local-level government (LLG) of the Autonomous Region of Bougainville, Papua New Guinea.

Wards
01. Baubake
02. Lugakei
03. Konnou
04. Makis
05. Lenoke
06. Wisai
07. Lule

See also
Buin, Papua New Guinea

References

Local-level governments of the Autonomous Region of Bougainville